Ender Eroğlu (born 25 March 1985), better known by his stage name Norm Ender, is a Turkish rapper, songwriter and musician.

Career 
At the age of ten, Ender started rapping after being influenced by the German-Turkish rap group Cartel. After dropping out of school, he started rapping in 2001 and then attended the music contest Akademi Türkiye broadcast by atv television channel.

Initially asked to sing pop music in the Akademi Turkiye contest, Ender refused to comply with the competition's request. Eventually, the Akademi introduced a rap course into its programme.

Ender began a group with Erman Altınoğlu, known as Ender & Erman or Erman & Ender. After completing his military service, in 2010 Ender made a solo rap album called Içinde Patlar. In 2012, he announced that he would release a new album. He gave concerts in İzmir, Diyarbakır and Ankara to promote this album and started using the stage name Norm Ender for his solo releases.

Ender became known on social media for his song "Eksik Etek". This song received about 40 million plays on YouTube in one month, making him the 17th most listened to Turkish artist of 2006.

After a 5-year break from music, in 2016 Ender announced a new album under the EMI-Universal Music Turkey label.

Norm Ender released the album Aura, which includes 9 tracks and real instruments, in 2017. He later unilaterally terminated his agreement with the company.

In 2018, Ender prepared and published an animation clip for the old song Depression Hotel.

In July 2019, Ender returned with the track "Mekanın Sahibi" (Owner of the Venue), which satirised the Turkish rap scene and specifically took aim at rappers like Ezhel and Ben Fero, calling them 'babies', and featuring a chorus that aimed to establish Ender's dominance over newer and younger rappers: "The owner of the venue is back, let's take the babies off the track". In November 2019, the song was taken down by Spotify due to alleged copyright violations. The song was again restored on Spotify in the same month. The song has passed 200 million streams

In 2020, he released a piece called Konu Kilit. Surprisingly, he released another single called İhtiyacım Yok It, without making an announcement.

He signed a contract with the Hummel brand in 2020 and continued the contract in 2021.

In 2021, he released a deephouse/rap piece called "Bulamazdım" accompanied by DJ Faruk Sabancı.

On November 19, 2021, he released the track "Kediler Aslan Olmaz (Cats Don't Be A Lion)".

On his birthday, March 25, 2022, he released the song "Sus Artık (Hush now)".

On August 5, 2022, he released the song "Sadece Öpücem (Just Kiss)" on the market, which he criticized.

Discography

Albums

Music videos 
 2002 - Kinim
 2007 - Tekir
 2010 - İçinde Patlar (Remix)
 2011 - Çıktık Yine Yollara
 2017 - Deli
 2017 - Kaktüs
2018 - Depresyon Oteli (Animation)
 2019 - Mekanın Sahibi
 2020 - Konu Kilit
 2020 - İhtiyacım Yok
2021 - Bulamazdım ft.Faruk Sabancı
2021 - Kediler Aslan Olmaz
2022 - Sus Artık
2022 - Sadece Öpücem

References

External links 
 
 
 

Turkish lyricists
Turkish rappers
Turkish hip hop musicians
Turkish male singers
1985 births
Living people